Antoine Bourseiller (8 July 1930 – 21 May 2013) was a French comedian and opera and theatre director.

Born in Paris in 1930, from 1960 to 1963 Bourseiller headed the Studio des Champs-Elysées. In 1966, he was named director of the Centre dramatique national d'Aix-en-Provence. He also directed the Théâtre Récamier. From 1982 until 1996 he was director of the Opéra de Nancy et de Lorraine.

Bourseiller won the Prix du Concours des Jeunes compagnies in 1960 and the Grand Prix du théâtre du Syndicat de la critique in 1963.

Personal life
He had a daughter, Rosalie Varda, from his relationship with director Agnès Varda. He had a second daughter, the rejoneadora (bullfighter) Marie Sara (born Marie Bourseiller), from his marriage to actress Chantal Darget (born Marie Chantal Chauvet). From this marriage he also had a stepson, Christophe Bourseiller (born Christophe Gintzburger).

Filmography 
 1981: Clara et les Chics Types
 1961: Cléo de 5 à 7

References

French comedians
French theatre directors
French opera directors
1930 births
2013 deaths